Stewart’s Automotive Group, initially operating as Stewart’s Auto Supplies & Repairs, was founded in 1938 and operates in Jamaica.

The service-oriented company evolved into Stewart’s Auto Sales Limited and are currently dealers of Suzuki, Mitsubishi and Honda Motorcycles as well as operators of Budget Rent-a-Car, through acquisitions of Issa Transport Group. The group is also the only authorized dealer in Jamaica of luxury brands BMW and Mini Cooper, making up Stewart Motors;

Broadening their reach in the automotive industry, a part of the group is Automotive Art, a retailer in car care products, and Stewart Industrial, adding heavy duty trucks and mining products and equipment to the group’s offerings.

Hospitality
The Group has extended itself beyond the auto business into the hospitality sector, a lucrative industry in the Caribbean. Their properties include: San Cove and San Bar Villas on the popular ‘San-San’ strip in Port Antonio, Portland and Windjammer, near Silver Sands in Trelawny.

Philanthropy
The firm consistently gives back to the development of Jamaica by supporting the national football team, the Reggae Boyz, Youth Upliftment Through Employment (YUTE) and many other organizations. The family-based company operates two not-for-profit charitable outfits: Kind Hearts and the Richard and Diana Foundation, which have assisted inner city communities within Jamaica.

References

External links

 Official website
 Stewart's Automotive Group Facebook page
 San Cove
 San Bar Jamaica 
 Windjammer Jamaica

1938 establishments in Jamaica
Companies of Jamaica